10,000 Reasons is a studio album by worship artist Matt Redman. It peaked on the US Christian Album chart at No. 1 and No. 149 on the UK charts.

Track listing

Personnel 

 Matt Redman – lead vocals 
 Nathan Nockels – keyboards, programming, acoustic guitar, electric guitar, backing vocals 
 Bryan Brown – acoustic guitar, backing vocals 
 Tyler Burkum – electric guitar 
 Matt Podelsa – electric guitar
 Jon Duke – bass
 Jacob Arnold – drums 
 Claire Indie – cello 
 Jules Adekambi – backing vocals 
 Jonas Myrin – backing vocals 
 Beth Redman – backing vocals 
 Katie Ashworth – additional vocals
 Morgan Blake – additional vocals
 Daniel Carson – additional vocals
 Katie Corven – additional vocals
 Kayla Johnson – additional vocals
 Stan Johnson – additional vocals
 Ji Lee – additional vocals
 Melodie Malone – additional vocals
 J. D. Meyers – additional vocals
 Travis Nunn – additional vocals
 John Pritchard – additional vocals
 Jennifer Richards – additional vocals
 Christoffer Wadensten – additional vocals
 David Williams – additional vocals

Production 

 Nathan Nockels – producer, overdub recording 
 Louie Giglio – executive producer 
 Shelley Giglio – executive producer 
 Brad O'Donnell – executive producer 
 Jim Dineen – recording engineer
 Christoffer Wadensten – additional vocals engineer
 Ainslie Grosser – mixing 
 Hank Williams – mastering 
 Jess Chambers – A&R 
 Mike McCloskey – A&R
 Leighton Ching – art direction, design

Charts

Certifications

References

2010 albums
Matt Redman albums